Yuriy Shturko (born 8 October 1984, in Kryvyi Rih, USSR) is a Ukrainian footballer. He last played for Metalurh Zaporizhya.

External links
Profile on Official Site (Ukr)
Profile at FFU Official Website (Ukr)

1984 births
Living people
Ukrainian footballers
FC Krystal Kherson players
FC Zirka Kropyvnytskyi players
FC Volyn Lutsk players
MFC Mykolaiv players
FC Kryvbas Kryvyi Rih players
FC Hoverla Uzhhorod players
FC Metalurh Zaporizhzhia players
Association football forwards
Sportspeople from Kryvyi Rih